Nicco Park or Nalban Metro Station is a station of Line 6 of the Kolkata Metro in front of the Nicco Park.

See also
List of Kolkata Metro stations

Kolkata Metro stations
Railway stations in Kolkata